ONIX (ONline Information eXchange) currently refers to any of three XML standard metadata formats developed by EDItEUR for use primarily within the book trade. ONIX was originally a single standard for capturing and communicating bibliographic data relating to books. That standard is now referred to as ONIX for Books and has been expanded to include better support for eBooks. A second ONIX family of standard messages, ONIX for Serials has been added to capture metadata pertaining to serialised publications. There is also a third standard, ONIX for Publications Licenses (ONIX-PL), designed to handle the licenses under which libraries and other institutions use digital resources.

According to EDItEUR, one of the principal organizations behind the creation of the ONIX standards, ONIX is "an XML-based family of international standards intended to support computer-to-computer communication between parties involved in creating, distributing, licensing or otherwise making available intellectual property in published form, whether physical or digital." It is to some extent based on the indecs Content Model.

External links

 BISG – Metadata committee, ONIX for Books

References

Metadata standards
Bibliography file formats
Industry-specific XML-based standards
Markup languages